South Plains College (SPC) is a public community college in Levelland, Texas.  It operates satellite branches in Plainview, at the Reese Technology Center, formerly Reese Air Force Base, in western Lubbock, and the Lubbock Center near central Lubbock.  SPC also has many classes in the Byron Martin Advanced Technology Center in Lubbock as part of a joint venture with the Lubbock Independent School District.

SPC has distance-education centers located in Muleshoe, Littlefield, and Denver City. In addition to its distance-education programs, the college also provides online (distance-education) courses to its students, as well as dual-credit courses to high schools in the West Texas area.

Service area
As defined by the Texas Legislature, the official service area of South Plains College is:
The Whiteface Consolidated Independent School District
All of Bailey, Lamb, Hale, Floyd, Motley, Cochran, Hockley, Lubbock, Crosby, Yoakum, Terry, Lynn, and Garza Counties
All of Gaines County, excluding the portion within the Seminole Independent School District

Campus
The Levelland Campus has twelve dormitories for students. The total collective capacity is 774 occupants.

Athletics

South Plains College plays as part of the Western Junior College Athletic Conference in athletics. It is also part of the National Junior College Athletic Association Region 5. The school participates in men's and women's basketball, cheerleading, cross-country, track and field, and rodeo. All the men's and women's basketball games are broadcast as part of the High Plains Radio Network under HPRN Sports on KLVT and online.

Notable alumni
Rondell Bartholomew, sprinter
Waylon Jennings, Country music singer  
Stanton Kidd, professional basketball player in the Japanese B.League
Philemon Hanneck, Olympian, middle distance 1500 meters and 5000 meters
Tranel Hawkins, Olympic track and field athlete
Mbarak Hussein, distance runner
Fred Kerley, track sprinter, seventh-fastest man at 400 meters
Sally Kipyego, championship runner for the Texas Tech Red Raiders, first Kenyan woman to win an NCAA cross-country individual championship
Natalie Maines, Country singer (Dixie Chicks)
Renaldo Major, NBA player
Bo Outlaw, NBA player
Renny Quow, Olympian, sprinter
Sheryl Swoopes, championship basketball player for the Texas Tech Red Raiders, WNBA player
LaToy Williams, sprinter
Lee Ann Womack, Country singer

References

External links
Official website

Universities and colleges in Lubbock, Texas
Community colleges in Texas
Education in Hockley County, Texas
Buildings and structures in Hockley County, Texas
Education in Lubbock County, Texas
NJCAA athletics